Montferland is a municipality in the Dutch province of Gelderland. It was created on 1 January 2005 from the amalgamation of the former municipalities of Bergh and Didam.

Population centres 
Formerly part of Bergh municipality:
Azewijn
Beek
Braamt
Kilder
Lengel
Loerbeek
's-Heerenberg
Stokkum
Vethuizen
Wijnbergen
Zeddam

Formerly part of Didam municipality:
Didam
Greffelkamp
Holthuizen
Loil
Nieuw-Dijk
Oud-Dijk

Gallery

Notable people 

 Willem IV van den Bergh (1537 in 's-Heerenberg – 1586) Stadtholder of Guelders and Zutphen
 Herman van den Bergh (1558 in 's-Heerenberg – 1611) a Dutch soldier in the Eighty Years' War
 Mechteld ten Ham (died 25 July 1605) an alleged Dutch witch in the city of 's-Heerenberg
 Everard Ter Laak (1868 in Didam - 1931) a Dutch Roman Catholic missionary in China
 Jozef Rulof (1898 in 's-Heerenberg – 1952) a Dutch author and psychic and trance medium or spirit medium
 Jos Som (born 1951 in Didam) a Dutch politician deputy Mayor of Didam
 Ernie Brandts (born 1956 in Nieuw-Dijk) a Dutch football manager and former player with 452 club caps
 Geert-Jan Derksen (born 1975 in Didam) a Dutch rower, silver medallist at the 2004 Summer Olympics

References

External links

Official website

 
Achterhoek
Municipalities of Gelderland
Municipalities of the Netherlands established in 2005